The 2019 Horizon League men's basketball tournament (also known as Motor City Madness) was the final event of the 2018–19 men's basketball season of the Horizon League. It began on March 5, 2019 and ended on March 12; first-round games were played at the home courts of the top four teams in regular-season league play, with all remaining games at Little Caesars Arena in Detroit.

Northern Kentucky, which shared the regular-season conference title with Wright State, won the tournament and thus received the conference's automatic berth into the NCAA tournament.

Seeds
The top 8 teams participated in the tournament. Teams were seeded by record within the conference, with the following tiebreaker system used to seed teams with identical conference records:

 Head-to-head record against the other team(s) involved in the tie.
 Record against the highest-placed team in the conference table not involved in the tie. If still tied, proceed down the conference standings.
 If two or more teams are tied for a league placement, they are considered a single entry for tiebreaking purposes, with collective records against said teams considered.
 If three or more teams are involved in a tie for a given seed, the above procedure is followed until the tie is either broken, or reduced to a two-team tie. If reduced to a two-team tie, the procedure restarts, this time with only the surviving teams analyzed.
 If teams remain tied after all of the following, the team with the higher NET rating at the end of the regular season, as published by the NCAA immediately after the end of the Horizon regular season, receives the higher seed.

Notes

Schedule

Bracket

References

Tournament
Horizon League men's basketball tournament
Horizon League men's basketball tournament 
Horizon League men's basketball tournament
Basketball competitions in Detroit
2019 in Detroit
College sports tournaments in Michigan